Antichasia is a municipal unit of the Elassona municipality. Before the 2011 local government reform it was an independent municipality. The seat of the municipality was in Krania. The 2011 census recorded 3,584 residents in Atichasia. The municipal unit covers an area of 142.919 km2. Its name comes from the nearby Antichasia mountain.

Population
According to the 2011 census, the population of the Antichasia was 3,584, a slight increase of 1% when compared with the population of the previous census of 2001.

See also
 List of settlements in the Larissa regional unit

References

Populated places in Larissa (regional unit)